Laodelphax striatellus is a species of true bug belonging to the family Delphacidae.

It is native to Eurasia and Northern Africa.

References

Delphacidae